A macaron
or French macaroon

is a sweet meringue-based confection made with egg white, icing sugar, granulated sugar, almond meal, and food colouring.

According to popular belief, the macaron has been introduced in France by the Italian chef of queen Catherine de Medici during the Renaissance but this appears to be a legend as the macaron is already mentionned in France in the 8th century in the Cormery Abbey.  Since the 19th century, a typical Parisian-style macaron is presented with a ganache, buttercream or jam filling sandwiched between two such cookies, akin to a sandwich cookie. The confection is characterized by a smooth squared top, a ruffled circumference—referred to as the "crown" or "foot" (or "pied")—and a flat base. It is mildly moist and easily melts in the mouth. Macarons can be found in a wide variety of flavours that range from traditional (raspberry, chocolate) to unusual (foie gras, matcha).

Name 
There is some variation in whether the term macaron or macaroon is used, and the related coconut macaroon is often confused with the macaron. In North America, most bakers have adopted the French spelling of macaron for the meringue-based treat to distinguish the two. Stanford professor of linguistics Daniel Jurafsky describes how the two confections have a shared history with macaroni (Italian , from Greek μακαρία). Jurafsky notes that French words ending with "-on" that were borrowed into English in the 16th and 17th centuries are usually spelled with "-oon" (for example: balloon, cartoon, platoon). In the UK, many bakeries continue to use the term "macaroon".

History
According to Dan Jurafsky in Slate magazine, Arab troops from Ifrīqiya (now Tunisia) brought new techniques (papermaking) and foods like lemons, rice and pistachios with them during their occupation of Sicily in 827.  These included many nut-based sweets such as fālūdhaj and lausinaj—baked goods with sweet almond cream inside.  These sweet pastries were handed down by the Sassanid shahs in Persia, where the almond cake was made to celebrate the Zoroastrian New Year (Nowruz). In Sicily (and in Toledo, Spain, another contact point between Muslim and Christian culture) fālūdhaj and lausinaj developed into various desserts, like the almond-paste tarts called marzapane and caliscioni. In 1154 Muhammad al-Idrisi reported the production of noodles, which was also carried out in Sicily for the first time.  Under the collective term Maccarruni, the Arabs referred to ground grain products as noodles and pastries.  The Italians borrowed maccheroni from Maccarruni, from which today's macarons are derived.

The culinary encyclopedia Larousse Gastronomique (1988) traces the origin of the macarons back to a French monastery in Cormery in the 8th century (791). At the same time, the encyclopedia entry spreads the pious legend that the shape of the pastry with a cracked crust was abandoned from the navel of a monk.

A Swiss online encyclopedia on the history of baking says that the almond biscuits were brought from al-Andalus (present-day Spain) to Marrakesh (present-day Morocco) in the early 11th century by the sultan and first king of the Almoravid dynasty Yusuf ibn Tashfin, and that it was served mainly during Ramadan.

During the Renaissance, French queen Catherine de' Medici's Italian pastry chefs made them when she brought them with her to France in 1533 upon marrying Henry II of France. In the 1790s, macarons began to gain fame when two Carmelite nuns, seeking asylum in Nancy during the French Revolution, baked and sold the macaron cookies in order to pay for their housing. These nuns became known as the "Macaron Sisters". In these early stages, macarons were served without special flavours or fillings.

It was not until the 1930s that macarons began to be served two-by-two with the addition of jams, liqueurs, and spices.  The macaron as it is known today, composed of two almond meringue discs filled with a layer of buttercream, jam, or ganache filling, was originally called the "Gerbet" or the "Paris macaron."  Pierre Desfontaines, of the French pâtisserie Ladurée, has sometimes been credited with its creation in the early part of the 20th century, but another baker, Claude Gerbet, also claims to have invented it. French macaron bakeries became trendy in North America in the 2010s.

Earliest recipe
Many Italian cookbooks of the 16th-century mention almond biscuits closely resembling macarons, albeit under different names. The earliest known recipe dates back to the early 17th century and appears to be inspired by a French version of the recipe.

Method

There are two main methods for making a macaron – the method using French meringue and the one using Italian meringue (also originated in France despite its name).

In the French meringue method, egg whites are whisked until stiff-peaked meringue forms. From there, sifted, ground almonds and powdered sugar are folded in slowly until the desired consistency is reached. This process of knocking out air and folding is called macaronage.

The method with Italian meringue involves whisking the egg whites with a hot sugar syrup to form a meringue. Sifted almonds and icing sugar are also mixed with raw egg whites to form a paste. The meringue and almond paste are mixed together to form the macaron mixture. This method is often deemed more structurally sound yet also sweeter and also requires a candy thermometer for the sugar syrup.

The vegan variation involves the use of aquafaba in place of egg white, and the butter is substituted as well. All other ingredients are essentially the same.

Either Italian or French meringue can be combined with ground almonds.

A macaron is made by combining icing sugar and ground almonds into a fine mixture. In a separate bowl, egg whites are beaten to a meringue-like consistency. The two elements are then folded together until they are the consistency of "shaving foam", and then are piped, left to form a skin, and baked. Sometimes, a filling is added.

Variations

France
Several French cities and regions claim long histories and variations, notably Lorraine (Nancy and Boulay), Basque Country (Saint-Jean-de-Luz), Saint-Émilion, Amiens, Montmorillon, Le Dorat, Sault, Chartres, Cormery, Joyeuse and Sainte-Croix in Burgundy.

Macarons d'Amiens, made in Amiens, are small, round-shaped biscuit-type macarons made from almond paste, fruit and honey, which were first recorded in 1855.

The city of Montmorillon is well known for its macarons and has a museum dedicated to them. The Maison Rannou-Métivier is the oldest macaron bakery in Montmorillon, dating back to 1920. The traditional recipe for Montmorillon macarons has remained unchanged for over 150 years.

The town of Nancy in the Lorraine region has a storied history with the macaron. It is said that the abbess of Remiremont founded an order of nuns called the "Dames du Saint-Sacrement" with strict dietary rules prohibiting the consumption of meat. Two nuns, Sisters Marguerite, and Marie-Elisabeth are credited with creating the Nancy macaron to fit their dietary requirements. They became known as the 'Macaron Sisters' (Les Soeurs Macarons). In 1952, the city of Nancy honoured them by giving their name to the Rue de la Hache, where the macaron was invented.

India
Thoothukudi in Tamil Nadu has its own variety of macaroon made with cashews instead of almonds, adapted from macarons introduced in colonial times.

Japan
Macarons in Japan are a popular confection known as マカロン (makaron). There is also another widely available version of makaron which substitutes peanut flour for almond and a wagashi-style flavouring. The makaron is featured in Japanese fashion through cell phone accessories, stickers, and cosmetics aimed towards women.

Switzerland
In Switzerland,  (also Luxembourger) are a brand name of macaron made by Confiserie Sprüngli in Zürich. A  comprises two disks of almond meringue with a buttercream filling in of many available flavors.  Luxemburgerli are smaller and lighter than macarons from many other vendors.

United States
Pastry chefs in the US have edited the classic cookie to include more traditional American flavours. Flavours of macarons available in the US have been known to include mint chocolate chip, peanut butter and jelly, Snickers, peach champagne, pistachio, strawberry cheesecake, candy corn, salted pretzel, chocolate peanut butter, oatmeal raisin, candy cane, cinnamon, maple bacon, pumpkin, and salted caramel popcorn.

South Korea 
In addition to macarons, fat-carons (뚱까롱, thick macarons), also called ttungcarons, were invented and became popular in South Korea. The bakers intentionally overfill the macaron filings and later decorate them as well. The appearance can resemble more to that of a small ice cream sandwich.

Popularity

In Portugal, Spain, Australia, France, Belgium, Switzerland, New Zealand and the Netherlands, McDonald's sells macarons in their McCafés (sometimes using advertising that likens the shape of a macaron to that of a hamburger). McCafé macarons are produced by Château Blanc, which, like Ladurée, is a subsidiary of Groupe Holder, though they do not use the same macaron recipe.

Outside of Europe, the French-style macaron can be found in Canada and the United States.

In Australia, Adriano Zumbo and his TV series MasterChef have contributed to the macaron becoming a popular sweet treat, and it is now sold by McDonald's in its Australian McCafe outlets.

Gallery

See also

 Alfajor, a similar Spanish confection
 Petit four

Notes

References
 
  (About the history of the macaron.)

Further reading

External links
 
 

Almond cookies
French pastries
National dishes
Meringue desserts